Portrait of Christina of Denmark was painted with oil on oak panel by Hans Holbein the Younger in 1538. It was commissioned that year by Thomas Cromwell, agent for Henry VIII, as a betrothal painting following the death of the English Queen Jane Seymour. It shows the then sixteen-year-old Christina of Denmark, widowed Duchess of Milan. Her striking manner and strength of character are apparent in the portrait. Although Henry was taken by the representation, the marriage proposal did not go ahead, not least because Christina was aware of Henry's earlier mistreatment of his wives. She is reported as saying, "If I had two heads, I would happily put one at the disposal of the King of England". Various political and practical obstacles related to her ties with the Lutheran church also thwarted the match.

Art historian Derek Wilson wrote that the portrait "is the loveliest painting of a woman [Holbein] ever painted, that is, it is one of the finest female portraits ever painted." Despite it not resulting in the marriage he had hoped for, Henry liked the portrait so much that he kept it until he died. It was acquired in 1909 by the National Gallery, London, where it is on permanent display.

Commission
Following the 1537 death of the English Queen Jane Seymour, Holbein was commissioned to paint portraits of noblewomen eligible to marry Henry VIII. Christina was Duchess of Milan, and widowed to Francesco II Sforza, who had died in 1535 when she was just thirteen. Thomas Cromwell sent Holbein and the ambassador Philip Hoby to Brussels to meet with her. He was tasked with providing a straightforward, exact portrait of the girl.

They arrived in Denmark on 10 March 1538, where on the 12th Christina sat for the portrait for three hours between 1:00 and 4:00 pm. Holbein would have been able to converse with her in his native German. That afternoon he made preparatory sketches of her head; the final oil painting was completed at some point shortly after his return to England.

Henry was so taken with the initial colour drawings for the portrait — which showed only her head — that, according to the imperial ambassador Eustace Chapuys, "since he saw it he has been in much better humour than he ever was, making musicians play on their instruments all day long". On the basis of the drawing, he commissioned Holbein to extend it to a full-length oil panel.

Description
Christina stands in full length in a frontal pose. She is set against a turquoise background, reminiscent of 15th century Burgundian art. She is dressed in black mourning clothes years after the death of her husband, as was the custom for women in noble Italian marriages. Her black gown is lined with brown fur. She throws a shadow against the wall behind her, a further strip of shadow appears on the right hand side, thrown by an unseen source. Her expression is lively and engaged. She is given bright red lips, whose colour is echoed by the red ring on her fingers. Her youth is conveyed through her half smile, oval face, shy expression and dimples.

Although the portrait is filled with indicators of her nobility, she has taken off her gloves, allowing an informal, intimate atmosphere. She is given almost perfect white skin, the tones of which are offset against the black overcoat.

Notes

Sources

 Bätschmann, Oskar. Hans Holbein. Princeton University Press, 1999. 
 John Rowlands, Holbein: The Paintings of Hans Holbein the Younger. Complete Edition. Boston, David R. Godine, 1985. 
Strong, Roy, "Holbein in England". The Burlington Magazine, Volume 109, No. 770, 1967
Wilson, Derek. Hans Holbein: Portrait of an Unknown Man. London: Pimlico, Revised Edition, 2006.

External links
At National Gallery

1538 paintings
Christina of Denmark
Collections of the National Gallery, London
Christina of Denmark